Events from the year 1581 in art.

Events
September 19 – Arnold Bronckhorst is appointed first court painter to James VI of Scotland.
Construction of the Uffizi in Florence as magistrates' offices, designed by Giorgio Vasari and continued by Alfonso Parigi the Elder and Bernardo Buontalenti, is completed.

Works

Anonymous – Portrait of Dorothy and Penelope Devereux (approximate date)
Antonio Campi – The Martyrdom of St. Lawrence (San Paolo Converso, Milan)
Lavinia Fontana
Deposition
Noli me tangere
Nicholas Hilliard – Portrait miniature of Sir Francis Drake

Births
October 21 – Domenico Zampieri, Baroque Italian painter (died 1641)
December 27 - Jean Chalette, French miniature and portrait painter (died 1643)
date unknown
Johan Bara, Dutch painter, designer and engraver (died 1634)
Frans Francken the Younger, Flemish painter (died 1642)
Cornelis Liefrinck, Dutch painter (died 1652)
Abraham Matthijs, Flemish Baroque painter (died 1649)
Panfilo Nuvolone, Italian Mannerist painter (died 1651)
Carlo Sellitto, Italian Caravaggisti painter (died 1614)
Artus Wolffort, Flemish painter (died 1641)
probable
Bernardo Strozzi, Italian painter (died 1644)

Deaths
September 19 - Frans Pourbus the Elder, Flemish Renaissance painter primarily of religious and portraits (born 1545)
 date unknown
Girolamo Comi, Italian Renaissance painter (born 1507)

 
Years of the 16th century in art